Muju virus (MUV) is a zoonotic negative-sense single-stranded RNA virus of the genus Orthohantavirus. It is a member virus of Puumala orthohantavirus.  It is one of four rodent-borne Hantaviruses found in the Republic of Korea. It is the etiologic agent for Hantavirus hemorrhagic fever with renal syndrome (HFRS). The other species responsible for HFRS in Korea are Seoul orthohantavirus, Hantaan orthohantavirus, and Soochong virus.

Transmission 
This species of Hantavirus has not been shown to transfer from person to person. Transmission by aerosolized rodent excreta still remains the only known way the virus is transmitted to humans. In general, droplet and/or fomite transfer has not been shown in the hantaviruses in either the hemorrhagic or pulmonary forms.

See also 
 Conjunctival suffusion
 List of cutaneous conditions
 Sweating sickness, which may have been caused by a hantavirus
 1993 Four Corners hantavirus outbreak

References

External links 
 CDC's Hantavirus Technical Information Index page
 Viralzone: Hantavirus
 Virus Pathogen Database and Analysis Resource (ViPR): Bunyaviridae
 Occurrences and deaths in North and South America

Viral diseases
Hantaviridae
Hemorrhagic fevers
Rodent-carried diseases
Biological weapons
Infraspecific virus taxa